Coenura elegans is a species of snipe flies, insects in the family Pelecorhynchidae. It is found in Chile.

References

External links 
 

Insects described in 1865
Pelecorhynchidae
Endemic fauna of Chile
Diptera of South America
Taxa named by Rodolfo Amando Philippi